Lionel Cooper may refer to:

 Lionel Cooper (rugby league) (1923–1987), Australian rugby league footballer 
 Lionel Cooper (mathematician) (1915–1979), South African mathematician